The departments of Senegal are subdivided into arrondissements. As of 2008 there were 133. The arrondissements are listed below, by department:

Bakel
Bélé Arrondissement
Kéniaba Arrondissement
Moudéry Arrondissement

Bambey

Baba Garage Arrondissement
Lambaye Arrondissement
Ngoye Arrondissement

Bignona

Kataba Arrondissement
Sindian Arrondissement
Tendouck Arrondissement
Tenghori Arrondissement

Birkilane
Keur Mboucki Arrondissement
Mabo Arrondissement

Bounkiling
Boghal Arrondissement 
Bona Arrondissement
Diaroumé Arrondissement

Dagana
Arrondissement of Mbane
Arrondissement of Ndiaye

Dakar

Almadies Arrondissement - divided into 4 communes d'arrondissement.
Grand Dakar Arrondissement - divided into 6 communes d'arrondissement
Parcelles Assainies Arrondissement - divided into 4 communes d'arrondissement
Plateau/Gorée Arrondissement - divided into 5 communes d'arrondissement

Diourbel

Ndindy Arrondissement
Ndoulo Arrondissement

Fatick

Diakhao Arrondissement
Fimela Arrondissement
Naikhar Arrondissement
Tattaguine Arrondissement

Foundiougne

Djilor Arrondissement
Niodior Arrondissement
Toubacouta Arrondissement

Gossas

Colobane Arrondissement
Ouadiour Arrondissement

Goudiry
Bala Arrondissement
Boynguel Bamba Arrondissement
Dianké Makha Arrondissement
Koulor Arrondissement

Guédiawaye

Guédiawaye Arrondissement -  divided into 5 communes d'arrondissement.

Goudomp
Djibanar Arrondissement
Simbandi Brassou Arrondissement 
Karantaba  Arrondissement

Guinguinéo
Mbadakhoune Arrondissement
Nguélou Arrondissement

Kaffrine
Note: As of 2006, Koungheul and the eastern section was removed from Kaffrine Department to form Koungheul Department. In 2008, Kaffrine became a Region in its own right, while Birkelene, Koungheul and Malem Hodar became departments within the new Region.
Gniby Arrondissement
Katakel Arrondissement

Kanel
Orkadiere Arrondissement
Wouro Sidy Arrondissement

Kaolack
Koumbal Arrondissement
Ndiedieng Arrondissement
Ngothie Arrondissement

Kébémer

Darou Mousti Arrondissement
Ndande Arrondissement
Sagata Arrondissement

Kédougou

Bandafassi Arrondissement
Fongolimbi Arrondissement

Kolda
Djoulacolon Arrondissement
Mampatim Arrondissement
Saré Bidji Arrondissement

Koumpentoum
Bamba Thialène Arrondissement 
Kouthiaba Wolof Arrondissement

Koungheul
Ida Mouride Arrondissement
Lour Escale Arrondissement
Missirah Wadene Arrondissement

Linguère

Barkedji Arrondissement
Dodji Arrondissement
Sagatta Dioloff Arrondissement
Yang-Yang Arrondissement

Louga

Keur Momar Sarr Arrondissement
Koki Arrondissement
Mbédiène Arrondissement
Sakal Arrondissement

M'bour
Fissel Arrondissement
Séssène Arrondissement
Sindia Arrondissement

Malem Hodar
Darou Minam Arrondissement
Sagna Arrondissement

Matam
Agnam Civol Arrondissement 
Ogo Arrondissement

Mbacké
Kael Arrondissement
Ndame Arrondissement
Taïf Arrondissement

Médina Yoro Foulah
Fafacourou Arrondissement
Ndorna Arrondissement
Niaming Arrondissement

Nioro du Rip

Medina Sabakh Arrondissement
Paoskoto Arrondissement
Wack Ngouna Arrondissement

Oussouye

Cabrousse Arrondissement
Loudia Ouolof Arrondissement

Pikine
Dagoudane Arrondissement - divided into 7 communes d'arrondissement
Niayes Arrondissement - divided into 4 communes d'arrondissement
Thiaroye Arrondissement - divided into 5 communes d'arrondissement

Podor

Cas-Cas Arrondissement
Gamadji Saré Arrondissement
Salde Arrondissement
Thille Boubacar Arrondissement

Ranérou Ferlo

Vélingara Arrondissement

Rufisque

Rufisque Arrondissement - includes 3 communes d'arrondissement
Sebikotane Arrondissement

Saint-Louis

Rao Arrondissement

Salemata
Dakateli Arrondissement
Dar Salam Arrondissement

Saraya
Bembou Arrondissement
Sabodala Arrondissement

Sédhiou
Diende Arrondissement
Djibabouya Arrondissement
Djiredji Arrondissement

Tambacounda
Koussanar Arrondissement
Makacolibantang Arrondissement
Missirah Arrondissement

Thiès
Keur Moussa Arrondissement
Notto Arrondissement
Thiénaba Arrondissement
Thiès Nord Arrondissement - a commune d'arrondissement
Thiès Sud Arrondissement - divided into 2 communes d'arrondissement

Tivaouane

Meouane Arrondissement
Merina Dakhar Arrondissement
Niakhene Arrondissement
Pambal Arrondissement

Vélingara
Bonconto Arrondissement
Pakour Arrondissement
Saré Coly Sallé Arrondissement

Ziguinchor

Niaguis Arrondissement
Nyassia Arrondissement

See also
Regions of Senegal
Departments of Senegal
Communes of Senegal

References
List of administrative divisions in Senegal
Collectivités locales from Republic of Senegal Government site, l'Agence de l'informatique de l'État (ADIE) .
Map of main subdivisions and more detailed maps on subdivisions
Décret fixant le ressort territorial et le chef lieu des régions et des départements , décret n°2002-166 du 21 février 2002.
Code des collectivités locales , Loi n° 96-06 du 22 mars 1996.

Notes

 
Subdivisions of Senegal
Senegal, Arrondissements
Senegal 3
Districts, Senegal
Senegal geography-related lists